Florida is a town and municipality of Puerto Rico located in the karst region north of Ciales, south of Barceloneta, east of Arecibo, and west of Manatí. Florida is not like other municipalities of Puerto Rico with multiple subdivisions called barrios. It has one barrio called Florida Adentro and two other subdivisions: Florida Zona Urbana and Pajonal . It is part of the San Juan-Caguas-Guaynabo Metropolitan Statistical Area.

History
Florida was founded first as a barrio of Barceloneta in 1881 when a priest named Father Carrión, the mayor of Barceloneta, and other dignitaries visited a tract of land of almost 4 acres. They decided to establish a new barrio. The owner of the land, Don Manuel Cintrón, granted the land while he retained a piece of it. The barrio was first called Florida Adentro.

During the 20th century, several efforts were made to declare Florida as a municipality. First, on April 14, 1949, House Representative Francisco Díaz Marchand presented a project to create a legislative commission that would study the economic and social conditions of the barrio, to determine the suitability of it as an independent municipality. The project was unsuccessful. In 1960, Manuel Frías Morales presented a law that would permit the study to establish the municipality but it was also unsuccessful.

Finally, on June 14, 1971, the Senate of Puerto Rico and Governor Don Luis A. Ferré approved the law that officially created the municipality of Florida. It is thus the youngest municipality established in the island.

On September 20, 2017 Hurricane Maria struck Puerto Rico. In Florida, 1400 homes were a total loss and 2,295 homes were partially damaged.

Geography
Florida is the second smallest municipality of Puerto Rico, with an area of 10 square miles. As the only municipality in Puerto Rico that has its urban area within the northern karst region (sometimes referred as the Northern Karst Hills), it is surrounded by low elevation, red clay and limestone haystack hills known in Caribbean Spanish as mogotes. The southern border of the municipality with Ciales remains one of the least developed areas on the island, due to the ruggedness of the karst. The Rio Encantado, a subterranean river, drains this area. Several caves are found in the town, including Román Cave, Miró Cave, and Juana Gómez Cave. Balcon Cave is located in Florida.

Barrios

As with all municipalities of Puerto Rico, Florida is subdivided into administrative units called barrios (which means barrios or boroughs or neighborhoods in English). A newer municipality of Puerto Rico, Florida has one barrio called Florida Adentro and two sub-barrios: Florida Zona Urbana and Pajonal. It does not have a "barrio-pueblo" like most of the other municipalities of Puerto Rico.

The following areas are neighborhoods in Florida:
Parcelas Arroyo
Parcelas Selgas
Pueblo Viejo
San Agustín
Perol
Tosas

Sectors

Barrios (which are like minor civil divisions) are subdivided into smaller local populated place areas/units called sectores (sectors in English). The types of sectores may vary, from sector to urbanización to reparto to barriada to residencial, among others.

Special Communities 

 (Special Communities of Puerto Rico) are marginalized communities whose citizens are experiencing a certain amount of social exclusion. A map shows these communities occur in nearly every municipality of the commonwealth. Of the 742 places that were on the list in 2014, the following barrios, communities, sectors, or neighborhoods were in Florida: Sector El Hoyo in Comunidad San Agustín, Comunidad Arroyo, Sector Polvorín in Comunidad La Ceiba, Comunidad La Fuente, Estancias de Arroyo in La Joya, Sector El Cerro in Pajonal, and Sectors La Charca and Los Quemaos (both) in Parcelas Selgas.

Culture

Festival and events
Florida celebrates its patron saint festival in September. The  is a religious and cultural celebration that generally features parades, games, artisans, amusement rides, regional food, and live entertainment.

Other festivals and events celebrated in Florida include:
 Three Kings Festival – January
 Cayenalisa Pineapple Festival –  July
 Cultural Fair of Río Encantado – October

Economy

Historically, Florida's economy relied heavily on agriculture, specifically pineapple crops and other fruit-related products. In recent decades, along with the rest of the Island, rapid urbanization and industrialization, along with economic challenges, have forced Florida's fruit industry to near extinction. Pharmaceutical manufacturing plants have been established in Florida.

Demographics

Florida is one of the least populated municipalities of Puerto Rico, perhaps due to its small size. The population, according to the 2000 census, was 12,237 with a population density of 1,236.7 people per square mile (475.6/km2). After its establishment in 1974, the population has steadily increased over the years, with 7,232 people in the 1980 census.

Statistics taken from the 2000 census shows that 86.0% of Florideños are of White origin, 4.9% are black, 0.2% are Amerindian etc.

Government

After its initial establishment, Florida belonged to the Barceloneta region. In 1949 and 1960 there were some attempts to separate the barrio from Barceloneta, but these were unsuccessful. However, in 1974, Governor Luis A. Ferré and the Puerto Rican Senate officially declared Florida an independent municipality. Its first mayor was Jorge L. Pérez Piñeiro. The current mayor is José Gerena Polanco, of the New Progressive Party (PNP). He was elected in the 2012 general elections.

The city belongs to the Puerto Rico Senatorial district III, which is represented by two Senators. In 2008, José Emilio González and Angel Martínez were elected as District Senators.

Symbols
The  has an official flag and coat of arms.

Flag
It consists of three horizontal stripes, with the following colors and widths: green the superior and white the inferior, with five modules of width each one, the center one red, with a width of one module.

Coat of arms
Field of silver, in an abyss, a gules (red) anchored cross, like the one in the Asturian district of Llanes. The cross is anchored between two branches of bloomed poinsettias (Poinsettia pulcherrima). A green terrace represents the hilly terrain of the town, with a stripe forming waves outlined in silver which represents the underground river of Encantado. At the top, a three tower gold crown distinct in municipalities coat of arms. The shield can be surrounded, to its flanks and bottom by two crossed coffee tree branches with fruits.

Names
Florida derives its name from the abundant flowers and natural resources on its land. It is also known as  due to an underground river called Encantado. Another nickname is the  due to its pineapple crops.

Education
There are several public and private schools, serving students in pre-kindergarten through twelfth grade, distributed throughout the municipality of Florida. Public education is handled by the Puerto Rico Department of Education. 
These are some of the schools in Florida, as of 2020:
 Adolfo Egüen School
 Juanita Ramírez González School
 Juan Ponce De León II School
 Francisco Frías Morales School 
 Ricardo Rodríguez Torres School 
 Early Head Start

Transportation
Puerto Rico Highway 22 provides access to PR-140, which leads to Florida from the cities of Mayagüez in the west, or San Juan in the north.

Like most other towns on the Island, it has a public transportation system consisting of small, subsidized private buses and vans called públicos. 

There is only one bridge in Florida.

Mayors of Florida
1974–1981 – Jorge Luis Pérez Piñeiro
1981–1984 – Heriberto González Vélez
1984–1992 – Juan Ramon De León Vélez [Johnny]
1992–2004 – Maria Dolores Guzmán Cardona [Maggie]
2004–2012 – José Aaron Pargas Ojeda
2012–present – José Gerena Polanco

Notable Florideños
 Charlie Montoyo – Current Manager of the Toronto Blue Jays and former Major League Baseball player
 Alexis Mateo – Drag queen and contestant on Season 3 of RuPaul's Drag Race

See also

List of Puerto Ricans
History of Puerto Rico

References

External links
 Municipality of Florida 
 Viability Study of Florida 
 Dr. Valentín's Historical Archives 
 
 Welcome to Puerto Rico! Florida

 
Municipalities of Puerto Rico
Populated places established in 1971
San Juan–Caguas–Guaynabo metropolitan area
1971 establishments in Puerto Rico